The Estonian Internal Security Service (officially , KAPO for short) is a central national security institution of Republic of Estonia.  Its purposes are centered on enforcing constitutional order. The Estonian Internal Security Service has primary investigative jurisdiction in some offences committed by state officials; countering terrorism; incitement to hatred; crimes against humanity and peace, including war crimes; illegal handling and trafficking of firearms, ammunition, explosives, radioactive material or other strategic materials; and the protection of state secrets. It also fills counterintelligence duties.

The Estonian Internal Security Service is administered as an agency of the Estonian Ministry of Internal Affairs.

While many of the Estonian Internal Security Service's activities are classified, its overview of the status of national security is published yearly as the Kaitsepolitsei aastaraamat.

History
Kaitsepolitseiamet was first established on April 12, 1920. From 1925 to 1940 the institution was known as Political Police (Poliitiline politsei, abbreviated PolPol). The PolPol fought against subversive activities of political extremists, espionage, desertion, smuggling and terrorism. The most discussed targets were the Estonian communists whose party had been declared an illegal organisation following the failed December coup, forcing them to operate clandestinely and through various legal fronts, usually as workers' organisations. Communists were supported by the Soviet Union, who had publicly accepted the principles not recognizing the parliamentary order, seeing terrorism as a legitimate activity. Similarly, the PolPol surveyed pro-Nazi oriented Baltic Germans and extreme monarchists of the White Russian emigres.

When the Soviet Union annexed Estonia on June 17, 1940 the PolPol was one of the first institutions which was practically in corpore repressed - almost all of its employees were deported in the course of the June deportations; before the end of the World War II more than 90% of the PolPol employees and their families were killed.

Re-establishment
The Estonian Internal Security Service was reestablished on March 1, 1991, as a part of restoration of Estonian independence from the Soviet occupation. Until June 18, 1993, the Estonian Internal Security Service was a department of the central police structure; then, it was reorganised as a distinct entity. Following adoption of a new law of security services on March 1, 2001, the status of the Estonian Internal Security Service was reclassified from a police institution to a security service.

According to an Amnesty International report from 2009: "In June, the Estonian Security Police Board published its annual report which made serious allegations against the Legal Information Centre for Human Rights (LICHR), an NGO promoting and defending the rights of those belonging to linguistic minorities. The report stated that the LICHR was used by the Russian Federation to carry out scientific research for propaganda purposes, and accused the LICHR of trying to conceal the specific sources of funding it received from the Russian Federation. These allegations were widely seen as an attempt by the government to misrepresent the LICHR and to undermine its attempts to secure the necessary financial and social support to carry out its work."

Criticism against the Estonian Internal Security Service has been presented by Risto Teinonen, a Finnish lawyer and neo-Nazi living in Tallinn. In 2009, Teinonen launched criminal proceedings against the Estonian Internal Security Service in a Tallinn court, accusing the organization of politically motivated persecution of innocent people.

See also
Eston Kohver

References

External links 

Julgeolekuasutuste Seadus, Riigi Teataja I 2001, 7, 17

Counterintelligence agencies
Law enforcement agencies of Estonia
Estonian intelligence agencies